Farzana Kochai (born 1992) is an Afghan politician and member of Afghan Parliament (Wolesi Jirga).

Life 
She was born in Baghlan Province.

After the Fall of Kabul, she announced that she would be staying in Kabul.

References 

1992 births
Living people
21st-century Afghan women
Afghan politicians
Afghan academics
Members of the House of the People (Afghanistan)
People from Baghlan Province
21st-century Afghan women politicians
21st-century Afghan politicians